Karen E. Rowe  (born 1945) is an American literary critic and a specialist in Renaissance literature.  She is a professor of English at UCLA.

Background
Rowe received her B.A. from Mount Holyoke College and Ph.D. from Indiana University.

Awards
UCLA Distinguished Teaching Award, 1982.
Fellow of the Bryn Mawr/HERS Mid-Atlantic Institute for Women in Higher Education Administration, 1986.
Executive Committee, Division on American Literature to 1800, Modern Language Association, 1989–94.
Chair of the Division and MLA Program, 1992.
Graduated from The American University in Cairo  with highest honors 1966.
Editorial Board Member, Early American Literature, 1987–1990.

Selected bibliography
 
  
  Pdf.

Notes

External links
Official site

Living people
American literary critics
Mount Holyoke College alumni
University of California, Los Angeles faculty
1945 births
Date of birth missing (living people)
Indiana University alumni
Place of birth missing (living people)
Women literary critics
American women critics